Opharus flavimaculata is a moth of the family Erebidae. It was described by George Hampson in 1901. It is found in Brazil and Peru.

References

Opharus
Moths described in 1901
Moths of South America